Thiri Maya Dewi Mi U-Si was a principal queen of King Razadarit of Hanthawaddy Pegu from 1392 to 1421.

Brief
According to the Razadarit Ayedawbon chronicle, the queen was the youngest daughter of Saw Ye-Bein, a senior minister at the Hanthawaddy court. Her personal name was Mi U-Si (မည်ဦးစည်). She had two elder sisters Mwei Ohn-Naung and Mwei Auk In April 1392, she became a senior queen of King Razadarit, with the title of Thiri Maya Dewi. Her two sisters were also raised as queens at the same ceremony.

She and her sisters were first cousins once removed of the king. Their father was a first cousin of Razadarit. Their paternal grandfather Binnya Thein was a noble from Chiang Mai who after a disagreement with the king of Chiang Mai had sought refuge at the court of King Binnya U. Their paternal grandmother was Tala Saw Lun, a daughter of King Saw Zein.

Ancestry

Notes

References

Bibliography
 

Queens consort of Hanthawaddy